Cavazzoni is an Italian surname. Notable people with the surname include:

Enzo Cavazzoni (1932–2012), Italian water-polo player
:it:Ermanno Cavazzoni (born 1947), Italian writer, author of the novel on which Fellini's film La voce della luna is based
Francesco Cavazzoni (1559–1612), Italian painter 
Girolamo Cavazzoni (c. 1525–after 1577), Italian organist and composer, son of Marco Antonio Cavazzoni
Marco Antonio Cavazzoni (c.1490–c.1560), Italian organist and composer
Stefano Cavazzoni (1881–1951), Italian politician 

Italian-language surnames